President of the Executive Council  may refer to:

The President of the Federal Executive Council of Yugoslavia, the full title of the head of the central government of Yugoslavia from 1963 to 1992
The President of the Executive Council of the Irish Free State, Head of government of the Irish Free State (1922–37), in fact the prime minister of the Irish Free State
A premier of a Canadian province (see Premier (Canada))

See also
Vice-President of the Executive Council